Tazeh Kand-e Galvazan (also Romanized as Tāzeh Kand-e Galvazān; also known as Tāzeh Kand) is a village in Shal Rural District, Shahrud District, Khalkhal County, Ardabil Province, Iran. At the 2006 census, its population was 201, in 48 families.

References 

Towns and villages in Khalkhal County